In Greek mythology, Clytoneus (Ancient Greek: Κλυτόνηος or Κλυτονήου) or Clytonaeus may refer to two different individuals:

 Clytoneus or Clytius, son of Naubolus of Argos and father of the Argonaut Nauplius II, father of Palamedes.
 Clytoneus, a prince of Corcyra as son of King Alcinous and Arete. Thus, he was the brother of Nausicaa, Halius and Laodamas. Clytoneus and his brother are the winners of the foot-racing contest in honour of Odysseus.

Notes

References 

 Apollonius Rhodius, Argonautica translated by Robert Cooper Seaton (1853-1915), R. C. Loeb Classical Library Volume 001. London, William Heinemann Ltd, 1912. Online version at the Topos Text Project.
 Apollonius Rhodius, Argonautica. George W. Mooney. London. Longmans, Green. 1912. Greek text available at the Perseus Digital Library.
 Homer, The Odyssey with an English Translation by A.T. Murray, PH.D. in two volumes. Cambridge, MA., Harvard University Press; London, William Heinemann, Ltd. 1919. . Online version at the Perseus Digital Library. Greek text available from the same website.

Characters in the Odyssey
Phaeacians in Greek mythology
Mythology of Argolis